Team Spain Roller Derby or the Spanish Roller Derby National Team represents Spain in international roller derby competitions such as the Roller Derby World Cup. It was created in 2013 with the goal of competing at the 2014 Roller Derby World Cup, which it did, December 4 to 7 in Dallas, Texas.

History 
Team Spain was created in June 2013, through the initiative of the skaters themselves, who desired to create a national team to compete internationally with Spain's first-ever national roller derby squad. The project began with the creation of a work group who selected Daisy Dioxin and Ref Judge Fred as Bench Staff. Shortly after, a first round of tryouts was held in December 16 to 18, 2013 in Madrid, Tenerife and Barcelona, which was attended by a total of 52 skaters. Additionally, video applications were submitted. A total of 35 skaters were selected to comprise the initial squad.

Roster 
This initial roster comprised 11 skaters from Barcelona Roller Derby, 10 from Tenerife Roller Derby, two from Black Thunders Derby Dames (Madrid), two from London Rollergirls, as well as one each from Alcoy Roller Derby, Dutchland Rollers, Garden State Rollergirls, Lisboa Roller Derby Troopers, Manchester Roller Derby, Rayo Dockers Valencia, Roller Derby Cáceres, Roller Derby Madrid, Toronto Roller Derby and Zaragoza Roller Derby.

2018 Roller Derby World Cup roster
The following skaters were on the final roster for the 2018 Roller Derby World Cup in Manchester, England:

In 2018, bench staff for Spain were La Justicia (Bench Coach), Lola Vulkano (Lineup Manager) and Elle Visse (Mirror Bench Coach).

2014 World Cup roster
The team were coached by Daisy Dioxin of London Rollergirls and Smarta of Crime City Rollers.

The following skaters were on the final roster for the 2014 Roller Derby World Cup in Dallas, Texas:

The following skaters made the initial training roster, but not the final roster which went to Dallas:

References

External links 

 Website .
 Official Facebook page .

Spain
Women's national sports teams of Spain
Roller derby in Spain
2013 establishments in Spain
National sports teams established in 2013